New York Fries is a Canadian quick service restaurant that mainly serves french fries, hot dogs and poutine.

There are 120 locations in Canada, as well as locations in Bahrain, China, Egypt, Macao, Oman, Panama, Qatar, Saudi Arabia, Turkey & United Arab Emirates.

History
New York Fries started as a stand at South Street Seaport. In 1983, Jay and Hal Gould found the stand from a New York Times review and initially bought the Canadian rights, eventually buying out the entire company in 1987.

The first Canadian location opened on August 16, 1984 at Scarborough Town Centre. It initially only sold fries and cola. The brand later introduced poutine onto its menu in 1989.

Cara Operations (now known as Recipe Unlimited) bought New York Fries in September 2015.

South St. Burger Co. 
Since the sale of New York Fries, South St. Burger Company is no longer run by New York Fries. South St Burger Co. has thirty locations across Canada and two in Dubai. South St. Burger Co. sells hamburgers, fries and poutine.

Locations 
New York Fries has 156 locations, including 120 in Canada and 36 outside of North America, mostly in the Middle East and China.

See also
List of Canadian restaurant chains
List of assets owned by Recipe Unlimited

References

External links
South St. Burger Co.

Recipe Unlimited
Fast-food chains of Canada
Hot dog restaurants
Restaurants established in 1984